Stan Fail (born June 11, 1936) is an American speed skater. He competed in the men's 5000 metres event at the 1964 Winter Olympics.

References

1936 births
Living people
American male speed skaters
Olympic speed skaters of the United States
Speed skaters at the 1964 Winter Olympics
People from Yuma County, Colorado